Events from the year 1722 in Denmark.

Incumbents
 Monarch – Frederick IV
 Grand Chancellor – Ulrik Adolf Holstein

Events
 27 November  A consortium is granted royal permission to establish Store Kongensgade Faience Manufactury in Copenhagen.

Undated
 Store Kongensgade Faience Manufactury opens in Copenhagen with a monopoly on production of fajance with blue decorations.
 The Lille Grønnegade Theatre in Copenhagen, the first public theater in Denmark, is opened.

Births
 2 September — Vigilius Eriksen, painter (died 1782)

Deaths

Full date unknown
 Benoît Le Coffre, painter to the Danish Court (born 1671)

References

 
1720s in Denmark
Denmark
Years of the 18th century in Denmark